This is a list of adventure parks (plural ) in Hungary. Adventure parks are of growing popularity in Hungary and as of December 2015 there are over fifty nationwide. Some  offer activities for all ages and levels of ability, while others are more oriented to physical sports.

Adventure parks are used not only as leisure centres but for team-building exercises and school trips.

List

Sources

Adventure parks